is a Japanese singer from Fujimi, Saitama. She is best known for her debut release, "You Get to Burning", the opening theme for Martian Successor Nadesico, as well as the movie version's theme song "Dearest" and the song "Chikyuugi", the opening theme for the arc The Hades-Sanctuary of Saint Seiya

She is part of the judging panel at the Animax Anison Grand Prix, with fellow noted anime singers Ichirou Mizuki and Mitsuko Horie.

Discography

Albums

Best Album
 (February 28, 2007)

Mini Album
 birth (2011) -self-produced-
 My Place ~for my dear~ (2013) -self-produced-

Cover Album
 (June 6, 2007)

Various Artists
Lovers Reggae (July 23, 2009)

Singles

Collaborations
 Anison All Stars - imagine (October 16, 2009) -John Lennon cover song-

References

External links

Official website

Anime musicians
1974 births
Living people
People from Saitama (city)
Musicians from Saitama Prefecture
21st-century Japanese singers
21st-century Japanese women singers